Holme may refer to:

 Holme (surname)

Music
 Holme (band)

Places

Antarctica
 Holme Bay

Denmark
 Holme, Aarhus

England
 Holme, Bedfordshire
 Holme, Cambridgeshire
 Holme, Cumbria
 Holme, North Lincolnshire, Lincolnshire
 Holme, North Yorkshire
 Holme, Nottinghamshire
 Holme, West Lindsey, Lincolnshire
 Holme, West Yorkshire
 Holme Fell, Cumbria
 Holme Island, a small tidal island off Grange-over-Sands, Cumbria
 Holme Valley, West Yorkshire
 Holme-next-the-Sea
 Holme-on-Spalding-Moor
 Holme on the Wolds
 Holme Moss
 The Holme, one of the villas in Regent's Park, London
 River Holme

Latvia
 Holme, former German name of Mārtiņsala

Norway
 Holme, Vestland, a village in Alver municipality, Vestland county
 Holme, old name of Holum

See also 
 East Holme
 West Holme
 Holm (disambiguation)
 Holmes (disambiguation)